Hedwig of Schleswig-Holstein (15 July 1626 – 5 October 1678) was the daughter of king Christian IV of Denmark and Kirsten Munk. She was the twin of her sister Christiane Sehested. She shared the title Countess of Schleswig-Holstein with her mother and siblings.

As with her siblings, she was raised by her grandmother Ellen Marsvin and the royal governess Karen Sehested. She and her twin sister, Christiane, were both married in Copenhagen royal palace in 1642: she to the noble Ebbe Ulfeldt. She and her sister Leonora Christina Ulfeldt were the only siblings present at her father's deathbed in 1648. In 1652, her spouse was deposed from his position on Bornholm, and the couple left for the Swedish court. The marriage was unhappy: Ulfeldt abused her - she called him "the damned creature" - and she had an affair with his servant. She separated from him in 1655 and joined her sister Leonora in Pomerania. She was present at her mother's funeral in 1658. She was ruined by her husband's debts, and moved to his estate in Skåne in 1664 out of poverty. She visited her sister Leonora during her imprisonment, corresponded with her and worked for her release.

Ancestry

References
 	 Dansk biografisk Lexikon / VII. Bind. I. Hansen - Holmsted  (in Danish)

1626 births
1678 deaths
17th-century Danish nobility
17th-century Danish people
Danish twins
Daughters of kings
Ulfeldt family
Children of Christian IV of Denmark